Unió Esportiva Lleida was a Spanish football team based in Lleida, in the autonomous community of Catalonia. It was founded as Lérida Balompié-AEM on 30 October 1939, and became Unión Deportiva Lérida in 1947, after a merger with CD Leridano. It held home matches at Camp d´Esports, with a 13,500-seat capacity. It was dissolved in 2011. The soul of the club was reformed as Lleida Esportiu.

Lleida adopted the Catalan version of its name in 1978. The club spent most of its history in the lower divisions, but in the early 1950s and early 1990s, the club won promotion to La Liga.

During the 1990s the club was managed by Mané, Juande Ramos and Víctor Muñoz, all of whom subsequently became successful managers with other clubs. From 1987 the club organised its own summer trophy, the Ciutat de Lleida Trophy.

History

Early Lleida football clubs
Football was first introduced to Lleida in 1910 by Manuel Azoz, a Barcelona business man. Among the earliest clubs in the city were Montserrat, founded in 1913 by Marist Brothers, and FC Lleida founded in 1914. Both played their early games in the district of Pla d’en Gardeny. In 1915, the Associació Cultural Lleidatana was founded by Catalan nationalists.

In 1918 FC Joventut was formed by left-wing Catalan republicans and during the 1920s they emerged as the city’s strongest side.

In 1919, Lleida became the first club to use the Camp d´Esports, but this team was dissolved in 1927. Other clubs of the 1920s included AE Lleida Calaveres, Lleida Sport Club and AEM Lleida, all of which disappeared during the 1930s.

Lérida Balompié and CD Leridano
After the Spanish Civil War, former members of AE Lleida Calaveres, Lleida Sport Club and AEM Lleida formed Lérida Balompié-AEM. After playing in regional leagues for four seasons they made their debut in the fourth division in 1943. The following year, the club split into two clubs, Lérida Balompié and AEM.

Meanwhile, in 1941 Spanish nationalists formed CD Leridano, and a local rivalry developed between that club and Lérida Balompié. On March 9, 1947, these two sides merged to become Unión Deportiva Lérida. The new team retained both the blue and white colours and club shield of Lérida Balompié, the first president of the new club being Eduard Estadella.

First golden era
UD Lérida enjoyed a golden age in the late 1940s and early 1950s, when they progressed from the third to the first division in just three seasons. In 1949, they won the third-tier and, the following season, 1949–50, they made their debut in Segunda División.

In the 1949–50 season the club achieved their biggest league victory in their history with a 9–2 win against CD Lugo, along with finishing second in the league achieving promotion to the topflight for the first time ever. However, during its debut season, it was heavily defeated on several occasions: 9–0 to CD Málaga, 10–1 to Deportivo de La Coruña and 10–0 to Athletic Bilbao, being ultimately relegated back. Lleida's first eleven in the first division was: Rivero, Rigau, Telechea, Carrillo, Esquerda, Roca, Gausí, Pellicer, Ramón, Bidegain and Fustero.

The Mané era
In the late 1980s and early 1990s, Lleida enjoyed a second solid moment, under coach Mané. He joined the club in 1988 and took it from Segunda División B to La Liga.

1993–94 was the second topflight experience for the club; in spite of a 1–0 win over the FC Barcelona Dream Team at the Camp Nou, and another against Real Madrid, 2–1 at home, Lleida only won seven times altogether and was relegated once again.

The 1994–95 season saw the club finish third in the second division, with a subsequent promotion play-off defeat against Sporting de Gijón. In 2001, the team returned to level three and, in 2004–05 and the following campaign, played again in the second division. From 1996 and during an entire decade (with some interruptions), legendary player Miguel Ángel Rubio served as its manager.

Liquidation
On 10 May 2011, Lleida was placed in a liquidation auction due to a €28 million debt. On 12 July, the team's seat was acquired by local entrepreneur Sisco Pujol, with the new club being named Lleida Esportiu.

Season to season

2 seasons in La Liga
24 seasons in Segunda División
19 seasons in Segunda División B
22 seasons in Tercera División (until 1976–77 as third level)

Honours

Official
Segunda División: 1992–93
Segunda División B: 1989–90, 2003–04
Tercera División: 1948–49
Regional Preferente: 1970–71
Segunda Regional: 1939–40, 1940–41
Copa Catalunya: Runner-up 1991–92, 1998–99

Friendly
Nostra Catalunya Trophy: 1974, 1975, 1977, 1981, 1986, 1987, 1990
Ciutat de Lleida Trophy: 1987, 1992, 1994, 1995, 1997, 2001, 2004, 2006, 2007, 2008

Records

Club
Best league performance: 16th, La Liga, 1950–51
Best cup performance: Last 16 (six times), 1986, 1993, 1995, 1997, 2000, 2005
Most league points: 68, 2003–04 (three points for a win) 60, 1957–58 (two points for a win)
Most league goals: 102, 1957–58
Most league wins in one season: 26, 1957–58
Best league win home: 9–0 v. Calella, 30 November 1941
Best league win away: 8–1 v. Europa, 22 February 1942
Best cup win: 7–0 v. Sant Andreu, 19 December 1985

Player
Most league appearances: 460, Miguel Rubio (1982–96)
Most league goals: 82, Mariano Azcona (1984–91)
Most league goals in a season: 25, Mariano Azcona (1989–90)
Most league goals in a match: 5, Mariano Azcona 6–1 v. Fraga, 15 October 1989 and Vallejo 7–1 v. Alavés, 23 May 1965
Most international appearances: 12, Miguel Mea Vitali (Venezuela) (2000–01)

Selected former players
Only international players or UEFA Champions League winners. Flags represent national teams player appeared for. 

 Tito Vilanova
 José Emilio Amavisca (1991–92)
 Estanislao Basora (1955–56)
 Carles Busquets (1999–2002)
 Canito (1975–76)
 Enric Gensana (1954–56)
 Marià Gonzalvo (1955–56)
 Tomás Hernández (1955–56)
 Eladio Silvestre (1960–61)
 Raúl Tamudo (1999)
 Unai Vergara (2005–07)
 Ali Benhalima (1990–93)
 Renaldo (2000–01)
 Mate Bilić (2005–06)
 Søren Andersen (1993–94)
 Goran Stanić (1998–2000)
 Michael Emenalo (1997–98)
 Carlos González (2000–01)
 Melanio Olmedo (1956–57)
 Ilija Stolica (1998–00)
   Dmitri Kuznetsov (1994–95)
 Julio Rodríguez (1995–98)
 Gustavo Matosas (1993–94)
 Manny Lagos (1991–92)
 Miguel Mea Vitali (2000–01)
  Boban Babunski (1994–96)
  Jovan Stanković (2004–05)
 Mauro Ravnić (1992–94)

Selected former coaches
 Mané (1988–95)
 Víctor Muñoz (1999–2000)
 Juan José Nogués (1954–55)
 Juande Ramos (1997–98)
 Manuel Ruiz Sosa (1971–72)
 Marcel Domingo (1962–63)
 Nicolae Simatoc (1959–60)

Presidents

 Sebastià Tàpies: 1939–40
 Joan Porta: 1941–47
 Eduard Estadella: 1947–51
 Llorenç Agustí: 1951–54
 Josep Servat: 1954–57
 Antoni Rocafort: 1957
 Laureà Torres: 1957–60
 Antoni Teixidó: 1960–62
 Ramon Vilaltella: 1962–67
 Josep Jové: 1967–68
 Pere Roig: 1968–69
 Manel Rosell: 1969–70
 Miquel Martínez: 1970–72
 Josep Montañola: 1972–74
 Lluís Nadal: 1974–77
 Josep Esteve: 1977–79
 Joan Planes: 1979–82
 Antoni Gausí: 1982–86
 Màrius Durán: 1986–96
 Josep Lluís González: 1996–97
 Màrius Durán: 1997–98
 Antoni Gausí: 1998–2002
 Miquel Pons: 2002–06
 Xavier Massana: 2006–07
 Ignasi Rivadulla: 2007–10
 Anabel Junyent: 2010–11

See also
List of UE Lleida records and statistics

References

External links

Official website 
Futbolme team profile 
Unofficial website 
Unofficial website #2 

 
Defunct football clubs in Catalonia
Association football clubs established in 1939
Association football clubs disestablished in 2011
Sport in Lleida
1939 establishments in Spain
2011 disestablishments in Spain
Segunda División clubs
La Liga clubs